MDW could refer to:

 59th Medical Wing, a U.S. Air Force medical wing, Joint Base San Antonio, Texas, U.S.
 Midway International Airport (IATA Airport Code), Chicago, Illinois, U.S.
 United States Army Military District of Washington
 Milwaukee District / West Line (MD-W), a Metra commuter rail line in Chicago, Illinois, U.S.
 Minnesota, Dakota and Western Railway, U.S. and Canada
 University of Music and Performing Arts Vienna, a music university in Vienna, Austria
 Maidstone West railway station
 An abbreviation for meadow, usually in a street name (as in Castle Mdw in Norwich).